Michael Preuß (born 6 January 1984) is a German former professional footballer who played as a forward.

Career
Preuß began his professional career with Hallescher FC, whom he joined in 2011, having played for a number of semi-pro clubs in Saxony-Anhalt, and helped the club earn promotion to the 3. Liga in his first season. He played in the club's first game at this level, a 1–0 win over Kickers Offenbach. He was released at the end of the 2012–13 season and signed for SSV Markranstädt.

References

External links

1984 births
Living people
German footballers
Association football wingers
Association football forwards
3. Liga players
VfB Germania Halberstadt players
Hallescher FC players
TuRU Düsseldorf players
People from Wernigerode
Footballers from Saxony-Anhalt